The Nicolaus Copernicus Monument, a 1966 copy of Bertel Thorvaldsen's 1830 monument in Warsaw, is installed in outside the Rio Tinto Alcan Planetarium in Montreal's Space for Life, and was previously installed in Chaboillez Square, outside the Montreal Planetarium. The statue was originally displayed for Expo 67, and was relocated to its current location in 2013.

 Artist: Bertel Thorvaldsen (1770–1844), Danish sculptor
 Materials
 Statue: bronze
 Base: concrete
 Dimensions:
 Statue: 2.7 m × 1.1 m
 Base: 1.8 m × 1.5 m
 Manufacturing: Bronze: Lauritz Rasmussen, Denmark, posthumous draw from plaster molds and original made in 1966 under the supervision of Dr. Dyveke Helsted, Thorvaldsen Museum director
 Inaugurated in 1967, Montreal World's Fair
 Acquired by the City of Montreal: 1968.

References

External links

1967 establishments in Canada
1967 sculptures
Bronze sculptures in Canada
Cultural depictions of Nicolaus Copernicus
Downtown Montreal
Mercier–Hochelaga-Maisonneuve
Monuments and memorials in Montreal
Monuments and memorials to scientists
Outdoor sculptures in Montreal
Sculptures by Bertel Thorvaldsen
Sculptures of men in Canada
Statues in Canada